= Ice Scooter =

An Ice Scooter, also marketed as an Ice Skeeter is a machine similar to a snowmobile which can be used on ice. It was sold and marketed by Sears Roebuck Corporation and other companies.
